Sanjiv Bhattacharya is a British journalist, based in the US. He was born in London and graduated from The University of Cambridge where he studied philosophy. His book Secrets and Wives: The Hidden World of Mormon Polygamy explores the polygamy west, including the Kingstons, who for over a century have also practiced incest breeding techniques, believing they are descendants from Abraham and Jesus.

A former features editor and current contributing editor for British GQ, he has written for several magazines and newspapers including The Observer, The Daily Telegraph, The Times, The Los Angeles Times, Marie Claire, Maxim and Details. He writes generally about social issues, fringe groups, the entertainment industry and boxing.

In 2006, he wrote and presented the Channel Four documentary The Man With 80 Wives, about Warren Jeffs, the fugitive prophet of the Fundamentalist Church of Jesus Christ of Latter Day Saints. He was subsequently commissioned by Simon & Schuster to write a book of investigative journalism about Mormon polygamy.

In 2008, he was appointed Editor of GQ India.

He lives in Los Angeles, California.

References 

British male journalists
Living people
Alumni of the University of Cambridge
Year of birth missing (living people)